Eremophila rostrata is a flowering plant in the figwort family, Scrophulariaceae and is endemic to Western Australia. It is an erect shrub with cylinder-shaped leaves, small sepals and glabrous, pink to deep red petals. There are two subspecies, both of which are critically endangered.

Description
Its branches are glabrous, have many raised glands and are sticky due to the presence of resin.

The petal tube is deep pink to red on the outside, pale pink inside. The petal tube and lobes are glabrous inside and out apart from a few hairs inside the tube. The 4 stamens extend as far as the tip of the petal lobes. Flowering time depends on subspecies.

Taxonomy and naming 
The species was first formally described by Robert Chinnock in 2007 and the description was published in his book Eremophila and Allied Genera: A Monograph of the Plant Family Myoporaceae. The specific epithet (rostrata) is a Latin word meaning "curved" or "beaked" referring to the shape of the fruits.

In the same book, Chinnock described two subspecies, and the names are accepted by the Australian Plant Census:

Distribution and habitat
Subspecies rostrata grows on a few quartzite hills and flats near Cue in the Murchison biogeographic region. in the Carnarvon, Gascoyne, Little Sandy Desert,

Subspecies trifida grows in hard, sandy loam near Perenjori in the Avon Wheatbelt biogeographic region.

Conservation
Both subspecies of E. rostrata are listed as "critically endangered" (CR) under the Environment Protection and Biodiversity Conservation Act 1999 (EPBC Act). The main threats to its survival are mining, road maintenance and grazing. An interim recovery plan has been prepared.

Use in horticulture
Although listed as critically endangered, specimens of this shrub have been grown in some gardens for more than 20 years. It is an attractive shrub with its dark green foliage contrasting with bright pink flowers in spring, sometimes in other months. It can be propagated from cuttings but is slow to strike and is more easily grafted onto Myoporum rootstock. It grows best in well-drained soli in a sunny or part-shaded position. It is drought tolerant, needing watering only once or twice during a long dry spell and is moderately frost tolerant.

References

Eudicots of Western Australia
rostrata
Endemic flora of Western Australia
Plants described in 2007
Taxa named by Robert Chinnock